John R. Hall Ed.D. (born John Robert Hall III March 5, 1975) is an American author and co-founder of Greenwood & Hall  perhaps best known for his work with Am I Still Autistic, a self-help book he authored in 2011. Hall also serves as a trustee for Chicago, Illinois based Roosevelt University and was appointed to the California Interagency Coordinating Council by Governor Jerry Brown in April 2014.

Early life 

Hall was diagnosed as "severely autistic" and "slightly mentally retarded" by multiple medical and mental health professionals at infancy including Ole Ivar Lovaas.

Career 

Hall began his professional career at the age of 18, working full-time at a small telephone answering service in Malibu, California, while attending Pepperdine University. In 1998, Hall co-founded Greenwood & Hall, which is now an educational technology company headquartered in Los Angeles, California. Hall served as Greenwood & Hall's chief executive officer until July 2017.

Education 

Hall earned his B.A. in Political Science in 1997 as well as a Masters in Business Administration in 2002, from Pepperdine University. He also earned his Doctorate in Education from the University of Southern California in 2012.

References

Sources 

Am I Still Autistic?: How a Low-Functioning, Slightly Retarded Toddler Became the CEO of a Multi-Million Dollar Corporation, Dr. John R. Hall. Opportunities In Education, LLC., Santa Monica. 2011 
TEDx Manhattan Beach: Journey To Purpose, 13 October 2012

External links 

 

1975 births
American male writers
American technology chief executives
Living people
People on the autism spectrum
Pepperdine University alumni
USC Rossier School of Education alumni